Silam may refer to:

Malaysia
 Silam, an area of Sabah, Malaysia
Mount Silam
Lahad Datu (federal constituency), renamed from Silam
Silam (federal constituency)
Silam (state constituency)

People
S. L. Silam, (born 1896), Lt. Governor of Puducherry Union Territory, India.

Other uses

SILAM (System for Integrated Modeling of Atmospheric Composition), an atmospheric dispersion model
Silam, baptism in the Tengrism religion
Silam, a name for the edible plant Perilla frutescens